The University of Groningen (abbreviated as UG;<ref>{{cite web |url=http://www.ukrant.nl/nieuws/rug-wordt-joedzjie |title=Rug wordt 'joedzjie |publisher=Universiteitskrant|access-date=19 April 2016 |archive-url=https://web.archive.org/web/20160427055819/http://www.ukrant.nl/nieuws/rug-wordt-joedzjie |archive-date=27 April 2016 |url-status=dead}}</ref> , abbreviated as RUG) is a public research university of more than 30,000 students in the city of Groningen in the Netherlands. Founded in 1614, the university is the second oldest in the country (after Leiden) and one of the most traditional and prestigious universities in the Netherlands.

The institution has been consistently ranked among the top 100 universities in the world, according to leading ranking tables. In the 2022 Aggregate Ranking of Top Universities, RUG is ranked third in the Netherlands.

The University of Groningen has eleven faculties, nine graduate schools, 27 research centres and institutes, and more than 175-degree programmes. The university's alumni and faculty include Johann Bernoulli, Aletta Jacobs, four Nobel Prize winners, nine Spinoza Prize winners, one Stevin Prize winner, various members of the Dutch royal family, several politicians, the first president of the European Central Bank, and a secretary general of NATO.

History

The institution was founded as a college in 1614 in an initiative taken by the Regional Assembly of the city of Groningen and the Ommelanden, or surrounding region. There were four faculties – Theology, Law, Medicine, and Philosophy.

The coat of arms of the university was confirmed by The Estates of the City and County of Groningen in 1615. It consists of the provincial arms, charged with an open book inscribed with the abbreviated words VER/BVM/DNI LV/CER/NA, short for Verbum Domini Lucerna Pedibus Nostris. The shield is surmounted by a golden crown of five leaves and four pearls.

In the first 75 years of its existence about 100 students enrolled every year. Almost half of the students and lecturers came from outside the Netherlands – the first rector magnificus, Ubbo Emmius, came from East Frisia in modern-day Germany, for instance – but at the same time there was already a close relationship between the university and the city and the surrounding region.

The development of the university came to a standstill at the end of the seventeenth and during the eighteenth century because of theological differences of opinion, a difficult relationship with the Regional Assembly and political problems that included the siege of the city by ‘Bommen Berend’ in 1672. On average two to three hundred students were registered with the university at any one time during this period.

During the French occupation between 1775 and 1814 the University of Groningen was administrated by the Imperial University of Paris. Unlike Leiden University, it was not shut down and the institute was renamed Imperial University of Groningen (Keizerlijke Universiteit Groningen). During this time period, it remained the only open university in the Kingdom of Holland. In 1815 after the Napoleonic Wars, at the same time as Leiden and Utrecht, the university gained recognition as a national college of higher education, but this was followed by discussions about closure. The situation improved when a new main university building, the Academiegebouw, was constructed in 1850, a building that was largely financed by the people of Groningen. A fire completely destroyed the building in 1906.

In the meantime, the Higher Education Act of 1876 had radically improved the position of the university, which was renamed the "Rijksuniversiteit Groningen" (RUG). Teaching took place in Dutch and Latin and the university was given a research as well as an educational duty.

The University of Groningen developed during the first decades of the twentieth century. The number of faculties and courses grew steadily while the number of students grew rapidly. When the university celebrated its first 300 years in 1914 there were 611 registered students; this had grown to 1,000 by 1924. After a drop back during the Depression, and in particular during the Second World War, the number of students grew rapidly from 1945 to reach 20,000 in 1994. In recent times there are about 32,700 students registered at the University of Groningen with the number of foreign students again growing steadily, and following the tradition set by the first Rector Magnificus, the number of German students and researchers has grown strongly in recent years.

In March 2015, the RUG signed an agreement with the China Agricultural University to establish a campus in the Chinese city of Yantai. This would have made the RUG the first Dutch university to open a campus in China. The plan was heavily criticised, mainly due to worries about the restriction of academic freedom caused by censorship in China. In January 2018, the plans were cancelled by the Executive Board of the UG, based on the "insufficient support for the project".

 Facts and figures 

Key facts and figures about the University of Groningen are:
 The university, as of 2020, has 34,000 students enrolled in various programs from the undergraduate level up to doctorate students. This includes 8,250 international students.
 The university currently has 3,600 individuals in its academic staff. The UMCG included, a third of the academic staff is international.
 425 full professors
 45+ bachelor's degree programmes (35+ bachelor's degree programmes are taught in English)
 120+ master's degree programmes taught in English
 40+ research master's and top programmes
 11 faculties (one in the Frisian capital of Leeuwarden), nine graduate schools
 140,000 alumni
 120+ nationalities
 8,000 research publications
 4,350 PhD candidates (51% international)
 1.0 billion EUR budget
 Research grants from the Dutch Research Council (NWO): 14 starting grants (Veni), 5 experienced research grants (Vidi) and 4 senior research grants (Vici) awarded in 2020
 Research grants from the European Research Council (ERC): 1 Starting Grant, 1 Consolidator Grant, 3 Advanced Grants and 1 Proof of Concept Grant awarded in 2020
 18 patent applications in 2020

The university operates under the BSA system, under which a first year undergraduate (bachelor) student must achieve a certain number of ECTS in order to progress to the second year. This varies from 30 ECTS to 45 ECTS among various degrees.

The University of Groningen is a member of the so-called Excellence Group of universities in Europe. The Excellence Group has 56 members, which is 1.3 percent of the approximately 4,500 European institutions of higher education.
 The University of Groningen belongs to the top 100 large comprehensive research universities in the world.
 On the 2021 ranking list, the University of Groningen ranked 80th place in the Times Higher Education World University Rankings.
 According to the 2019 U.S. News & World Report the Faculty of Economics and Business ranks as 3rd in The Netherlands, 10th in Europe and 32nd in the world for Economics and Business.
 The university ranked 64 in the Academic Ranking of World Universities (ARWU) in 2021. ARWU is a global Top 500 published annually by the Shanghai Jiao Tong University. In addition to this overall score, the university falls within the global top 100 for several specific fields and subjects: Psychology (41), Clinical Medicine (51-75), Business Administration (37), Ecology (51-75).
 The university was ranked 73rd in the world in 2019 by the National Taiwan University that publishes the Performance Ranking of Scientific Papers for World Universities.
 The university currently holds the 14th position in the European ranking (85 worldwide) of Webometrics.
The university was ranked 3rd place in the UI GreenMetric World University Ranking in 2021, which includes 780 universities. UI GreenMetric World University Rankings was launched by Universitas Indonesia (UI) to focus awareness on sustainability in university policy-making. Universities are ranked in the basis of self-reported data in the areas of Setting and Infrastructure, Energy and Climate Change, Waste, Water, Transportation, and Education and Research.
From 2019 to 2020, the university was ranked 91st place in the Centre for World University Rankings (CWUR).
In 2019, Times Higher Education introduced a new ranking: the Europe Teaching Rankings. The university was ranked 26th place, which includes more than 200 universities. This new ranking focusses on higher education institutions' teaching quality and learning environments for students.
The university was ranked 1st in The Netherlands by U-Multirank (UMR)in 2019. UMR was developed by a consortium consisting of the Centre for Higher Education Policy Studies (CHEPS) in Twente, the Centre for Higher Education (CHE) in Germany and the Centre for Science and Technology Studies (CWTS) in Leiden. The university achieved the highest score on 16 indicators that include International Orientation dimension, Research and Knowledge Transfer.
 The Faculty of Economics and Business is accredited by both AACSB and EQUIS.
 The RUG has its own newspaper: the Universiteitskrant.

The university's Center for Information Technology (CIT) houses an IBM Blue Gene/L supercomputer and data center of Target used by the LOFAR project as well as a Virtual Reality and 3D-visualisation center.

Organisation

The RUG has 6,250 employees.

The university library was renovated between 2013 and 2017. The RUG has a branch in Leeuwarden. Plans to establish a "branch campus" in China's Yantai were called off in January 2018, and the University Museum is now in the process of being established.

The University of Groningen is represented in the Academic Heritage Foundation, a foundation that aims to preserve university collections and cultural treasures.

 Faculties 

The University of Groningen is organized in eleven faculties that offer programmes and courses in the fields of humanities, social sciences, law, economics and business, spatial sciences, life sciences, and natural sciences and technology. Each faculty (cf., College in the USA or School in Europe) is a formal grouping of academic degree programmes, schools and institutes, discipline areas, research centres, and/or any combination of these drawn together for educational purposes. Each faculty offers bachelor's, master's, PhD, and exchange programmes, while some also offer short certificate courses.

Since 2014, the RUG also has a partly independent liberal arts college, University College Groningen (UCG).
 Faculty of Economics and Business
 Faculty of Arts
 Faculty of Law
 Faculty of Theology and Religious Studies (as of September 2023, this will be the Faculty of Religion, Culture and Society)
 Faculty of Philosophy
 Faculty of Behavioural and Social Sciences
 Faculty of Medical Sciences
 Faculty of Science and Engineering
 Faculty of Spatial Sciences
 University College Groningen
 

 National Cooperation 
Exposome-NL, Dutch consortium cooperating in the field of exposome research.

 International Cooperation 
The University of Groningen engages in many types of international cooperation throughout both teaching and research. The main networks and partners of the university are:

Enlight, an alliance of nine European universities, The Guild of European research-intensive universities  and the Coimbra group, a network of 37 long established European multidisciplinary universities.
Strategic partnerships (academic connection): Universität Hamburg (UHH) and Carl von Ossietzky Universität Oldenburg 
Global strategic partnerships: Nanyang Technological University (Singapore), Osaka University (Japan), Macquarie University (Australia), Universitas Gadjah Mada (Indonesia), Universidad de Antioquia (Colombia), Universidad de Chile (Chile), Universidad Nacional Autónoma de México (Mexico), Universidade de São Paulo (Brazil), Stellenbosch University (South Africa)

 Campus 
The various faculties are housed around the city. Most of the faculties- including the faculties of Law, Arts and Philosophy are located in and around the city center. The university's original building, which acts as the main administrative building, lies exactly in the center of the city at the Broerstraat. The faculty of medical sciences is located close by at the University Medical Center Groningen(UMCG). The Faculties of Economics and Business, Spatial Sciences, and Science and Engineering are housed in the northern outskirts of the city, at the Zernike Campus, named after Nobel Prize winner Frits Zernike. The Zernike campus is also shared by the Hanze University of Applied Sciences, the other big university in the city, making the total number of students studying there around 40,000.

The university has libraries in three locations: the main one at the city center, one in the Duisenberg building in Zernike Campus, and one in the faculty of medicine, that includes a vast array of books and online material for students. The library at the city center also has a Starbucks on its premises. The university has also recently opened another campus in Leeuwarden, Friesland, referred to as "Campus Fryslân", that offers multiple disciplines in both undergraduate and postgraduate levels.

 Student life 
The city of Groningen is known as the student city of the Netherlands; around one-third of the city's residents are students at either The University of Groningen or at the Hanze University of Applied Sciences. The university, through ACLO, offers a wide range of sporting activities, and courses. Almost each sport has its own association, and offers the use of its facilities at discount rates for students.

The university also has multiple student societies that organize social events for its members, as well as student and study associations, that are mostly concerned with specific faculties and courses.

The use of bicycles as the means for transport is particularly prevalent for locals and students alike, and has integrated, labelled bike paths from the city center to Zernike. The city is popularly referred to as "The World Cycling City" because of this.

 Student housing 
The University of Groningen does not have student accommodation. It does, however, offer students with accommodation via SSH Student Housing, which operates student houses in various locations in Groningen, and various other cities within the Netherlands. A significant number of students live in private accommodations within the city, however, a recent addition to the housing options for students is The Student Hotel as well. In an effort to combat the annual housing shortage, the city of Groningen has incentivized the construction of short-term accommodation such as The Village which is made of shipping containers for international students. The Dutch government has strict laws for private accommodations for both tenants (students) and the landlords, so that fair rent prices, and renting conditions can be maintained.

In 2018, the university received national attention due to the housing crisis in the city of Groningen. Due to the fact that most incoming students at the university are primarily from other parts of the country, or the world, there has been a lack of housing options for students. Especially in the fall semester of 2021 the housing crisis hit its peak with hundreds of students reportedly not having any accommodation and resorting to emergency shelters.  The housing shorting evoked a protest in the city centre which culminated in the Academy building being temporarily occupied by students to put pressure on the city to extend emergency housing. 

Research
In 2019, 708 PhD students were admitted to a PhD programme (compared to 816 in 2018). Around 50% of the admitted PhD students came from abroad. In 2019, a total of 546 PhDs took place, 22 of them cum laude. The national share was thus around 11%.

Research schools, centres and institutesHumanities and Social Sciences Center for Language and Cognition Groningen (CLCG)
 Centre for Religion and Heritage
Centre for Religion, Conflict and Globalization (CRCG)
Centre Religion, Health and Wellbeing
CRASIS, Culture, Religion and Society in Graeco-Roman Antiquity
Globalisation Studies Groningen (GSG)
 Groningen Institute of Archeology (GIA)
 Groningen Institute for Educational research (GION)
 Groningen Research Institute of Philosophy (GRIPH)
 Groningen Research Institute for the Study of Culture (ICOG)
 Heymans Institute
Institute of Indian Studies
 Interuniversity Center for Social Science Theory and Methodology (ICS)
Qumran Institute
 Urban and Regional Studies Institute (URSI)Law Centre for Law, Administration and Society (CRBS)
 Groningen Centre of Energy Law (GCEL)Economics & Business SOM research instituteLife Sciences Research School of Behavioral and Cognitive Sciences (BCN) / UMCG
 Research Institute BCN-BRAIN / UMCG
 Cancer Research Center Groningen (CRCG) / UMCG
 Groningen Institute for Evolutionary Life Sciences (GELIFES)
 Groningen University Institute for Drug Exploration (GUIDE) / UMCG
 Groningen Biomolecular Sciences and Biotechnology (GBB)
 Groningen Research Institute of Pharmacy (GRIP)
 Science in Healthy Ageing and healthcaRE (SHARE), UMCG
 W.J. Kolff Institute for Biomedical Engineering and Materials Science / UMCGScience and Engineering'''
 Bernoulli Institute for Mathematics, Computer Science and Artificial Intelligence
 ENTEG - Engineering and Technology Institute Groningen
 ESRIG - Energy and Sustainability Research Institute Groningen
 GBB - Groningen Biomolecular Sciences and Biotechnology Institute
 GELIFES - Groningen Institute for Evolutionary Life Sciences
 GRIP - Groningen Research Institute of Pharmacy
 ISEC - Institute for Science Education and Communication
 Kapteyn Astronomical Institute
 Stratingh Institute for Chemistry
 Van Swinderen Institute for Particle Physics and Gravity
 Zernike Institute for Advanced Materials (ZIAM)

Graduate schools
The University of Groningen's Graduate Schools are organized somewhat different from its international counterparts. The main difference is that the Graduate Schools do not contain all Master's programmes; Graduate Schools manage and facilitate the two-year Master's programmes: top master's degree programmes and Research master's degree programmes.
 Graduate School of Behavioural and Social Sciences
 Graduate School of Economics and Business
 Graduate School of Humanities
 Graduate School of Law
 Graduate School of Medical Sciences
 Graduate School of Philosophy
 Graduate School of Science
 Graduate School of Spatial Sciences
 Graduate School of Theology and Religious Studies

Notable alumni
Notable alumni of the University of Groningen include:
 Annemarie, Duchess of Parma, journalist, consultant, and member of the Dutch royal family
 Hans van Abeelen, first Dutch behavior geneticist
 Johann Heinrich Alting, theologian
 Gerbrand Bakker, early 19th century physician
 Bart Becht, former CEO of Reckitt Benckiser
 Johan van Benthem, logician
 Maarten van den Bergh, former Chairman of Lloyds TSB, named the most powerful businessman in Great Britain in 2005 by The Times
 Johann Bernoulli, mathematician
 Bart Bok, astronomer
 Marc Bolland, former CEO of Marks & Spencer
 Dolf van den Brink, CEO of Heineken USA
 Corina Brussaard, Antarctic researcher in viral ecology and phytoplankton
 Anita Buma, Antarctic researcher in marine ecophysiology
 Turtle Bunbury, Irish historian and author
 James Burnett
 Job Cohen, former mayor of Amsterdam and former leader of the Dutch Labour Party
 Lex van Dam, hedge fund manager, featured on Million Dollar Traders on BBC2
 Wim Duisenberg, first president of the European Central Bank in Frankfurt studied at UG and obtained his PhD on the economics of disarmament
 Ubbo Emmius, founder of the University of Groningen and first rector magnificus
 Ben Feringa, Nobel Prize in Chemistry in 2016 for his work on molecular motors, professor of Chemistry
 Pim Fortuyn, lecturer, later politician and founder of the Pim Fortuyn List (and assassinated in 2002)
 Willem Frederik Hermans, lecturer and writer
 Gerardus Heymans, philosopher and psychologist
 Jack Hoeksema, linguist and professor in the Department of Dutch Language and Culture
 , jurist, attorney-general of Suriname and acting governor
 Peter Hofstee, professor of theoretical physics, joined IBM in 1996, currently the chief architect of the Synergistic Processor Element (SPE) of the Cell microprocessor
 Johan Huizinga, historian
 Niccolò Invidia, member of parliament Italy
 Aletta Jacobs, first woman in the Netherlands to receive an MD
 Ashin Jinarakkhita, Indonesian Buddhist monk
 Klaas Knot, current President of the Dutch central bank De Nederlandsche Bank (DNB)
 Jaap Kunst, ethnomusicologist (studied law)
 Wei Ji Ma, professor of psychology and neuroscience
 Prince Maurits van Oranje Nassau, first cousin of King Willem-Alexander of the Netherlands
 John Nerbonne, professor of humanities computing, expert in dialectology, member of the Dutch Royal Academy of Science
 Wubbo Ockels, first Dutch astronaut, received a PhD degree in physics and mathematics, 1973
 Heike Kamerlingh Onnes, received the Nobel Prize in Physics for his experiments on the properties of matter at low temperatures which made the production of liquid helium possible
 Jan Oort, astronomer
 Maria Oudeman, businesswoman and former President of Utrecht University (studied law)
 Paul Polman, CEO of Unilever
 Johannes Jacobus Poortman, philosopher, psychologist
 Dagmar Reichardt, professor of Cultural Industry at University of Latvia
 James Renwick (1662–1688) Scottish Covenanter
 Willem de Sitter, astronomer
 Tom Snijders, statistician and sociologist, expert on multilevel analysis and developer of Siena in R, a program for longitudinal social network analysis
 Henk G. Sol, Professor of Business Engineering and ICT
 Dirk Stikker, Secretary General of NATO
 Pieter Jelles Troelstra, lawyer, politician (early 20th century)
 René Veenstra, professor of sociology, expert on social network analysis and group processes in bullying
 Wietse Venema, programmer and physicist
 Roel de Vries, Global Head of Marketing at Nissan Motor Corporation* Clemens von Bönninghausen, lawyer, botanist, homeopathic physician
 Jacques Wallage, former mayor of Groningen
 Hans Wijers, Chairman of the Supervisory Board of ING, former CEO of AkzoNobel
 Paramanga Ernest Yonli, Prime Minister of Burkina Faso (2000–2007), studied Economics
 Frits Zernike, professor of theoretical physics, received the Nobel Prize in Physics for his invention of the phase-contrast optical microscope in 1953. The university campus in the northern part of Groningen is named in his honour.
 Epke Zonderland, 2012 Olympics gold medalist

Notable researchers

 Dirk Bezemer (born 1971), economist
 Mineke Bosch, historian
 Cornelis de Bot, linguist
 Marijn van Dijk, developmental psychologist
 Caroline van Eck, art historian
 Paul van Geert, developmental psychologist
 Nathalie Katsonis, chemist
 Wander Lowie, linguist
 Angus Maddison, British economist
 Lodi Nauta, professor of the History
 Sijbren Otto, chemist of Philosophy
 Erik Scherder
 Diederik Stapel, professor of social psychology known for fabrication of research data
 Wolfgang Stroebe, social psychologist
 Albert Szent-Györgyi, biochemist, awarded the Nobel Prize in Physiology or Medicine in 1937
 Marjolijn Verspoor, linguist
 . applied physics
 Ben Feringa, synthetic organic chemist, awarded the Nobel Prize in Chemistry in 2016
 , professor of Ethics and its history
 Amina Helmi, Argentine astronomer, and a professor of dynamics, structure and formation of the milky way
 Cisca Wijmenga, professor of Human Genetics
 Theunis Piersma, professor of Global Flyway Ecology
 Linda Steg, professor of environmental psychology, and a pioneer and world leader in the field of environmental psychology
 Sabeth Verpoorte professor of microfluidics and miniaturized "lab-on-a-chip" systems in the Faculty of Science and Engineering
 Jacques Zeelen, professor of globalization studies and humanitarian action

See also
 Education in the Netherlands
 Energy Delta Institute
 List of early modern universities in Europe

References

Further reading
  Klaas van Berkel: Universiteit van het Noorden. Vier eeuwen academisch leven in Groningen. Part 1 De oude universiteit 1614-1876''. Hilversum, Verloren, 2014.

External links

 
University of Groningen Datasets

 
1614 establishments in the Dutch Republic
Buildings and structures in Groningen (city)
Educational institutions established in the 1610s
Supercomputer sites
Groningen, University Of
Law schools
Education in the Dutch Republic